Grishin is a rural locality (a settlement) and the administrative center of Grishinskoye Rural Settlement, Kikvidzensky District, Volgograd Oblast, Russia. The population was 916 as of 2010. There are 11 streets.

Geography 
Grishin is located on Khopyorsko-Buzulukskaya plain, 15 km southeast of Preobrazhenskaya (the district's administrative centre) by road. Krutoy Log is the nearest rural locality.

References 

Rural localities in Kikvidzensky District